Mario Rodríguez Varela (20 October 1937 – 10 May 2015), was an Argentine professional footballer. Nicknamed Mariulo, he was the topscorer of the 1964 Copa Libertadores with six goals.

Club career
He was born in Palermo, Buenos Aires and grew in Barrio Norte; he played at youth level for Chacarita Juniors. He then made his professional debut in 1957, playing in the Argentine second level; during the 1960 season he debuted in Primera División Argentina for Chacarita Juniors: thanks to his goalscoring skills, good physical strength and  he managed to become one of the best forwards of the Argentine league. In 1963 he and Raúl Savoy moved to Independiente: Rodríguez was one of the protagonists of the two wins in the 1964 and 1965 editions of the Copa Libertadores, scoring many goals. He then left Independiente for Vélez Sarsfield, but he struggled to obtain opportunities to play, and eventually decide to leave Argentina for Chile. He then signed for Colo-Colo, where he played 2 seasons, scoring a total of 28 goals in 52 games. He then moved back to Argentina in 1971.

International career
Rodríguez played 10 international games for Argentina between 1962 and 1963. His first game was Argentina-Uruguay played on 13 March 1962. He scored 5 of his 6 goals during the 1963 South American Championship, and scored the sixth one on 16 April 1963 against Brazil.

References

External links
 BDFA profile

1937 births
2015 deaths
Argentine footballers
Argentine expatriate footballers
Club Atlético Independiente footballers
Club Atlético Vélez Sarsfield footballers
Chacarita Juniors footballers
Colo-Colo footballers
Chilean Primera División players
Argentine Primera División players
Expatriate footballers in Chile
Association football forwards
Footballers from Buenos Aires